Satyakam Mohkamsing is an Indian musician who plays classical violin.  He was born in New Delhi in 1987. While living in the Netherlands, he got his bachelor's (2010) and master's (2012) degrees from the Rotterdam music academy Codarts.

Mohkamsing's father, Narinder Mohkamsing, is a musicologist and Sanskritist, who early-on caused his son to develop an interest in Indian music and arts. In 1995 Mohkamsing started his initial training in Indian music under the violinist Satyaprakash Mohanti, a student of N. Rajam, in Varanasi. He also trained under Lenneke van Staalen, Hariprasad Chaurasia and Dhruba Ghosh. In addition, he received training from established vocalists such as Rita Bokil and Sambyal 'Rangilewale' Thakur. He regularly travels to India to attend masterclasses and to perform.

Performing career 
Mohkamsing started playing violin at the age of seven. By the time he was ten, he was performing on stage. Since then he has appeared at music venues in various countries of Europe, in India, and in South America.  He has a full performing schedule across the Netherlands as featured violinist, accompanied by local or visiting Indian musicians such as Rishabh Dhar (from Calcutta). Mohkamsing has engaged with kindred spirits in the context of world music and fusion genres. He has performed with the NOO Ones, Eclect-E, and as musical arranger of classical Bollywood scores, such as the show 'A tribute to Mohammed Rafi'. A US tour is planned for 2016.

References 
http://www.tropentheater.nl/docs/tropentheater/docs/2012-4-05-The-Noo-ones.pdf

External links
 http://www.satyakammusic.com/

1986 births
Living people
Indian violinists
21st-century violinists